The 2016–17 Kerala Premier League Season was the fourth season of the Kerala Premier League. Unlike last 3 seasons, the season featured 11 teams which were divided into 2 groups with Group A having 5 and Group B having 6 teams and wes played on a home-and-away format with half of the teams being private clubs. Later Quartz SC announced its withdrawal from the league making the number of teams 10. The season kicked off on 8 April 2017. KSEB beat FC Thrissur in the finals to clinch their maiden Kerala Premier League title.

Teams

It featured 11 teams from Kerala affiliated to the KFA competing for the Trophy. The league is played in a home and away format for the first time. Three points are awarded for a win, one for a draw and zero for a loss. At the end of the season a table of the final League standings is determined, based on the following criteria in this order: points obtained, goal difference, and goals scored.

Stadiums and locations

w Withdrawn

Results

League table

Group A

Group B

Knockout stage

Fixtures and results
 Cancelled Matches

Semi-finals

Final

Season statistics

Top scorers

Hat-tricks

Season awards

References

Kerala Premier League seasons
4